It Chapter Two is a 2019 American supernatural horror film directed by Andy Muschietti from a screenplay by Gary Dauberman.  It is the sequel to It (2017) and the second of a two-part adaptation of the 1986 novel It by Stephen King, primarily covering the second chronological half of the book. The film stars Jessica Chastain, James McAvoy, Bill Hader, Isaiah Mustafa, Jay Ryan, James Ransone, Andy Bean, and Bill Skarsgård as Pennywise. Set in 2016, 27 years after the events of the previous film, the story centers on the Losers Club and their relationships as they reunite to destroy It once and for all.

Talks for an It sequel began in February 2016. By September 2017, New Line Cinema announced that the film would be released in September 2019, with Dauberman writing the script and Muschietti to direct. Principal photography began on June 19, 2018, at Pinewood Toronto Studios and on locations in and around Port Hope, Oshawa, and Toronto, and wrapped on October 31.

It Chapter Two premiered at the Regency Village Theatre in Los Angeles on August 26, 2019, and was released in the United States on September 6, in 2D, Dolby Cinema, and IMAX formats, by Warner Bros. Pictures. The film received mixed reviews from critics, who praised its performances (particularly that of Skarsgård and Hader), production design, and themes, but criticized its runtime, pacing, and scares, which were unfavorably compared with its predecessor’s. Despite this, it was a box office success, grossing over $473 million worldwide against its $79 million production budget.

Plot

Twenty-seven years after  its initial defeat, Pennywise returns to Derry, Maine, in 2016. It brutally kills a man named Adrian Mellon after he and his boyfriend are brutally assaulted by homophobic teens after a carnival.

Mike Hanlon, the only member of the Losers Club who remained in Derry, calls the other members, Bill Denbrough, Ben Hanscom, Beverly Marsh, Richie Tozier, Eddie Kaspbrak, and Stanley Uris to honor the promise they made 27 years earlier to kill Pennywise if he came back. All of them return to Derry, except for Stanley, who kills himself out of fear of the creature. At a Chinese restaurant, Mike refreshes the Losers' memories before Pennywise itself reveals the news of Stanley's suicide to them by fortune cookies, as well as horrific-like creatures. Outside the restaurant, it is revealed that Pennywise was right about Stan killing himself. This causes Richie and Eddie to decide to leave, until Beverly is forced to reveal that she has had nightmare-like visions (due to Pennywise using the deadlights on her 27 years back) of their deaths if they fail to fulfil their oath. Meanwhile, It kills a young girl named Victoria at a baseball game after luring her into a trap. 

At the library, Mike shows Bill, via a drug-induced vision, that the Native American "Ritual of Chüd" can stop It for good. Mike explains that the ritual requires items from their past to be sacrificed. After explaining, Bill goes to the storm drain where Georgie was killed and recovers his paper sailboat, not before being attacked by an army of zombie-like hands. Beverly retrieves Ben’s love letter from her childhood home before being attacked by It in the form of a demonic elderly woman named Mrs. Kersh. Richie goes to the Capitol theater (which was closed down) where he collects a game token from a machine. After a flashback, he encounters Pennywise, who confronts him on his hidden homosexuality. Ben returns to the town’s high school and has a flashback to when he was attacked by It in the form of a demonic Beverly, and taunted by Pennywise about him being alone, while Eddie recovers an inhaler from a pharmacy and is attacked by the Leper. Meanwhile, Henry Bowers, who was arrested for killing his father, is freed from a mental hospital by It (in the form of a zombie-like version of Patrick Hockstetter). Bowers viciously attacks Eddie at the Losers’ hotel, before attacking Mike at the library; Henry nearly kills Mike, but Richie impales him before he has the chance. The Losers then rejoin Bill (who just failed to save a young boy named Dean from being eaten by It) at the Neibolt House, and convince him not to face It alone. 

With their memories now fully restored, and after more encounters with It the group descends into a cavern beneath the sewers, with Mike providing a rock from the Losers' fight with the Bowers Gang, and Eddie also providing Stanley's token (which was a shower cap), as they perform the ritual in the remains of the meteor that brought It to Earth. The ritual traps the Deadlights, It's true form, in a sealing jar, but a giant red balloon emerges from the jar, and explodes, revealing It as an enormous Pennywise-spider hybrid. The creature pressures Mike into revealing that It killed the Natives originally performing the ritual because their fears overtook them, a fact Mike had hidden from the Losers, which makes Bill and Richie furious with Mike. It attacks the Losers and places Bill, Ben, and Beverly in individual traps, which they escape once Bill releases his guilt over being indirectly responsible for Georgie’s death, and when Beverly realizes Ben was the one who wrote the love letter to her. Mike stands up to the creature, only to almost get eaten, but Richie manages to distract It, but gets caught in It's Deadlights in the process. Eddie saves him, but is fatally impaled by one of It's claws. A weakened Eddie then explains how he made It feel small earlier, by choking the leper nearly to death. The Losers confront Pennywise on how they’ve overcome their fears, and are no longer scared of the entity, causing It to shrink to a small weakened Pennywise. Mike rips out It's heart, which he and the Losers crush with their bare hands, finally killing It. Richie and the others rush back to Eddie, but find out he has died from his injuries. Richie still believes that he can be saved, but the Losers have to drag him away from Eddie's body, leaving it behind, while It's cavern implodes, destroying the Neibolt House.

The remaining Losers return to their old swimming area and wash off from their confrontation with It, and join hands to comfort Richie as he mourns for Eddie. It's demise has also caused the scars on their hands to disappear. After the Losers part ways, Ben and Beverly get married, Richie returns to the kissing bridge where he had once carved his and Eddie's initials, Mike decides to move out of Derry and start a new life, and Bill begins writing his new story before receiving a call from Mike as he leaves Derry, learning that Stanley sent them all posthumous letters. The letters reveal that Stanley was too scared to face It, and that his suicide was intended to strengthen his friends against It. His last words in the letters indicate that they will always be losers.

Cast

 Jessica Chastain as Beverly "Bev" Marsh: The only female member of the Losers Club, who was abused physically and sexually by her father and bullied at school over false rumors of promiscuity. Beverly has become a successful fashion designer in New York City while enduring an abusive marriage to Tom Rogan but later divorces him and marries Ben.
 Sophia Lillis as Young Beverly Marsh
 James McAvoy as William "Bill" Denbrough: The resourcefully determined former leader of the Losers Club who hunted down and defeated It in the summer of 1989. (Bill was primarily motivated by vengeance, because It killed and ate his younger brother, Georgie.) He swore that he and the other Losers would return to Derry if It resurfaced. As an adult, Bill is a successful mystery novelist in Los Angeles whose works are often criticized for having the same lame endings.
 Jaeden Martell as Young Bill Denbrough
 Bill Hader as Richard "Richie" Tozier: Bill's bespectacled best friend and fellow member of the Losers Club, whose loud mouth and foul language often get him into trouble, who also has secret romantic feelings for Eddie. As an adult, Richie becomes a successful stand-up comic in Chicago.
 Finn Wolfhard as Young Richie Tozier
 Isaiah Mustafa as Michael "Mike" Hanlon: A member of the Losers Club who fought against It. As an adult, Mike is the only one to stay in Derry and becomes the town librarian. The only one who remembers everything that happened in the previous film, he summons the other Losers back to Derry when It resurfaces.
 Chosen Jacobs as Young Mike Hanlon
 Tristian Levi Cox and Torian Matthew Cox as 4-year-old Mike Hanlon
 Jay Ryan as Benjamin "Ben" Hanscom: A member of the Losers Club who fought against It, was bullied as a child for being overweight and had a crush on Beverly. As an adult, he is an attractive and successful but lonely architect living in upstate New York and running his own company called Hanscom Architecture.
 Jeremy Ray Taylor as Young Ben Hanscom
 James Ransone as Edward "Eddie" Kaspbrak: A member of the Losers Club, a hypochondriac and victim of Munchausen syndrome by proxy. As an adult, Eddie is a successful risk analyst for an insurance firm in New York City and is married to Myra, who is very similar to his over-protective mother Sonia.
 Jack Dylan Grazer as Young Eddie Kaspbrak
 Andy Bean as Stanley "Stan" Uris: A pragmatic member of the Losers Club who aided in the battle against It in 1989. As an adult, he becomes a founding partner of a large accounting firm in Atlanta and is married to a woman named Patty Blum. 
 Wyatt Oleff as Young Stanley Uris
 Bill Skarsgård as Pennywise the Dancing Clown: An ancient predatory creature from another dimension brought to Earth millions of years ago by a meteorite. It awakens every 27 years to feed on the fear of children that it kills. Pennywise is It's favorite and primary guise, although It is shown to take many in order to instill fear into It's victims. It was overpowered and seriously wounded by the Losers Club in 1989, forcing It into premature hibernation. This defeat motivates it to rebuild its strength and kill the Losers once they return to Derry.

Other guises of It include Joan Gregson as Mrs. Kersh, an apparently sweet and gentle elderly woman, actually a monster, who lives in Beverly's childhood home; Javier Botet as Hobo, a leper who encountered Eddie at the 29 Neibolt Street house, and also as The Witch, the monstrous form of Mrs. Kersh; Jackson Robert Scott as Georgie Denbrough, Bill's late younger brother; and Owen Teague as Patrick Hockstetter, a young hoodlum who was eaten by Pennywise in the sewers in 1989. It also briefly appears without clown makeup, under the alias Bob Gray (also Skarsgård).

Additionally, Teach Grant portrays Henry Bowers, who terrorized the Losers Club in the summer of 1989 before he was incarcerated for killing his father while under It's influence. Nicholas Hamilton reprises his role as the young Henry Bowers. Molly Atkinson reprises her role as Sonia, Eddie's Munchausen syndrome by proxy-stricken mother, and also plays Eddie's wife Myra, who is very similar to Sonia. Xavier Dolan and Taylor Frey appear as Adrian Mellon and Don Hagarty, a gay couple who are attacked by a group of youths during a carnival before Mellon is killed by It, while Jake Weary appears as Webby, the leader of the youth gang who attacks Adrian and Don. Luke Roessler portrays Dean, a young boy who meets Bill near the storm drain where Georgie was killed in 1988, and is later killed by It at the Funland, while Ryan Kiera Armstrong appears as Victoria Fuller, a little girl with a large birthmark on her cheek, who is killed by It after he lures her to under the bleachers at a baseball game. Jess Weixler portrays Bill's wife Audra Denbrough (née Phillips), Will Beinbrink portrays Beverly's abusive husband Tom Rogan, and Martha Girvin appears as Stanley's wife Patty. Stephen Bogaert, Jake Sim, Logan Thompson, Joe Bostick and Megan Charpentier reprise their roles from the first film as Beverly's abusive father Alvin Marsh, Henry's friends Reginald "Belch" Huggins and Victor "Vic" Criss, pharmacist Mr. Keene, and Keene's daughter Gretta, respectively. Juno Rinaldi portrays the adult Gretta. Katie Lunman reprises her role as Betty Ripsom in a vocal capacity, in addition to portraying a second character, Chris Unwin, one of Webby's friends who participates in assaulting Adrian and Don.

Stephen King cameos as a pawn shop owner, the film's director Andy Muschietti cameos as a customer at the pharmacy, and filmmaker Peter Bogdanovich cameos as himself, the director of the film based on Bill's novel. Brandon Crane (who played young Ben Hanscom in the 1990 TV miniseries adaptation of It) also makes a cameo appearance as a board member of Hanscom Architecture. Filmmaker Guillermo del Toro was sought for a cameo as the janitor that Ben encounters when fleeing from Pennywise. Despite nearly securing del Toro, he was not included in the final film. King's son and fellow author Joe Hill was originally envisioned to cameo as the younger version of the pawn shop owner in a flashback scene with young Bill and Beverly, but the scene was cut from the final draft of the screenplay. Maturin the Turtle was reported to be in the film. This did not happen, although a golden turtle statue can be seen in Ben's home and a smaller one can be seen in a classroom scene.

Production

Development
On February 16, 2016, producer Roy Lee, in an interview with Collider, mentioned a second It film, remarking, "[Dauberman] wrote the most recent draft working with [Muschietti], so it's being envisioned as two movies."

On July 19, 2017, Muschietti revealed that production was set to begin in the spring of 2018, adding, "We'll probably have a script for the second part in January [2018]. Ideally, we would start prep in March. Part one is only about the kids. Part two is about these characters 27 years later as adults, with flashbacks to 1989 when they were kids."

On July 21, 2017, Muschietti spoke of looking forward to having a dialogue in the second film that does not exist within the first, stating, "... it seems like we're going to do it. It's the second half, it's not a sequel. It's the second half and it's very connected to the first one." Muschietti stated that two cut scenes from the first film will possibly be included in the second, one of which being the fire at the Black Spot from the book.

On September 25, 2017, New Line Cinema announced that the sequel would be released on September 6, 2019, with Gary Dauberman writing the script and Andy Muschietti returning to direct. Dauberman would later leave the project to write and direct Annabelle Comes Home, while Jason Fuchs was brought in as his replacement.

Casting
In an interview in July 2017, the child actors from the first film were asked which actors they would choose to play them in the sequel. Sophia Lillis chose Jessica Chastain and Finn Wolfhard chose Bill Hader, both of whom would end up cast in those roles.

In September 2017, Muschietti and his sister mentioned that Chastain would be their top choice to play the adult version of Beverly Marsh. In November 2017, Chastain herself expressed interest in the project. Finally, in February 2018, Chastain officially joined the cast, reuniting her with Muschietti, who directed her in Mama. By April 2018, Hader and James McAvoy were in talks to join the cast to play adult versions of Richie Tozier and Bill Denbrough, respectively. In May 2018, James Ransone, Jay Ryan and Andy Bean joined the cast to portray adult versions of Eddie Kaspbrak, Ben Hanscom, and Stanley Uris, respectively.

In June 2018, Isaiah Mustafa joined as the adult version of Mike Hanlon, while Xavier Dolan and Will Beinbrink were also cast as Adrian Mellon and Tom Rogan, respectively. Later, Teach Grant was cast to play the adult version of Henry Bowers, played by Nicholas Hamilton, and Jess Weixler was also cast, as Bill's wife. This is the second collaboration between McAvoy, Chastain, Hader, Weixler and Beinbrink after The Disappearance of Eleanor Rigby. In September 2018, it was revealed that Javier Botet would appear in the film. He played It in its Hobo and Witch forms.

Filming
Principal photography on the film began on June 19, 2018, at Pinewood Toronto Studios. The sewer system set was constructed at Pinewood, while the actual grate is located in North York. Much of the location work was done in and around Port Hope during summer 2018, as the town stood in for the fictional Maine town of Derry; signs and decor were changed as necessary. The Town Hall exterior was used as the Derry Library. Some exterior shots of the hotel were filmed at the town's Hotel Carlyle.

Some interiors were filmed at a 1902 mansion in Toronto, Cranfield House, while homes in the city, and in Oshawa and Pickering, were used as exteriors. An old mansion set was built for exteriors of the Pennywise home, and later burned, in Oshawa. The synagogue in the film was actually the Congregation Knesseth Israel in Toronto. Derry High School exteriors were filmed at the Mount Mary Retreat Centre in Ancaster, Ontario. Other locations used by the production included the Elora Quarry Conservation Area, the Scottish Rite in Hamilton, Ontario, Audley Park in Ajax, Ontario, Rouge Park in Scarborough, Toronto (as The Barrens) and The Mandarin Restaurant in Mississauga.

Filming concluded in early November 2018 after 86 days of production.

Post-production
The visual effects were provided by Atomic Arts and Method Studios. They were supervised by Brooke Lyndon-Stanford, Justin Cornish, and Josh Simmonds, as well as Nicholas Brooks as the Production Supervisor, with help from Cubica, Lola VFX, Make VFX, Rodeo FX and Soho VFX. The teenage actors were digitally de-aged to match their respective ages during filming of the first film.

Music

On March 29, 2019, it was announced that English composer, conductor, and pianist Benjamin Wallfisch, who had previously composed original scores for films such as Hidden Figures, Blade Runner 2049 and Shazam!, was set to compose the soundtrack for It Chapter Two, marking this as the second time the composer has worked with director Andy Muschietti, after previously composing the soundtrack for the first It theatrical film in 2017. The soundtrack features 45 original tracks that were released on August 30, 2019.

According to Wallfisch, the score for It Chapter Two features a larger orchestra and choir than previously and draws on both themes from the first film's soundtrack with "more scale and ambition — to reflect the scope of the film", as well as creates new themes to reflect the characters development over the past 27 years.

Marketing
The first concept art of the adult versions of the Losers' Club was released on July 2, 2018, as principal photography began. The first teaser poster of the film was released on October 31, 2018. A first look from the film was shown at the CinemaCon on April 2, 2019. A second teaser poster was released on May 9, 2019, along with a teaser trailer. On July 17, 2019, the second poster and the theatrical trailer were released at the San Diego Comic-Con. The studio spent a total of $95 million promoting the film worldwide.

Release

Theatrical
It Chapter Two had its world premiere at the Regency Village Theater in Los Angeles, California on August 26, 2019, and was theatrically released in the United States on September 6, 2019, by Warner Bros. Pictures.

Home media
The film was released in a digital format on November 19, 2019. A release on DVD, Blu-ray, and 4K was on December 10, 2019, in the United States.

Reception

Box office
It Chapter Two grossed $211.6 million in the United States and Canada, and $261.5 million in other territories, for a worldwide total of $473.1million. Deadline Hollywood calculated the net profit of the film to be $169million, when factoring together all expenses and revenues.

In the United States and Canada, the film was projected to gross $90–100million from 4,570 theaters in its opening weekend, and the week of its release broke Fandango's record for most advance tickets sold by a horror film. The film made $37.4million in its first day, including $10.5million from Thursday night previews, the second-highest total for both a September opening and horror film, behind the first film's $13.5million. It went on to debut to $91million, also the second-best ever for a horror film and a September release, while being over $30million less than the first film. The lower debut was attributed to a more mixed critical reception, as well as the nearly three-hour runtime, which exhibitors said curbed business. The film also had the fifth-highest opening weekend for an R-rated film, behind its predecessor It, The Matrix Reloaded, Deadpool and Deadpool 2. It made $39.6million in its second weekend, retaining the top spot, before making $17.0million in its third weekend and being dethroned by newcomer Downton Abbey.

Critical response
On review aggregator Rotten Tomatoes, the film holds an approval rating of 62% based on 379 reviews, with an average rating of 6.10/10. The website's critical consensus reads, "It Chapter Two proves bigger doesn't always mean scarier for horror sequels, but a fine cast and faithful approach to the source material keep this follow-up afloat." On Metacritic, which uses a weighted average, the film has a score of 58 out of 100, based on 52 critics, indicating "mixed or average reviews". Audiences polled by CinemaScore gave the film an average grade of "B+" on an A+ to F scale, the same as the first film, while those at PostTrak gave it an overall positive score of 76% and a 56% "definite recommend".

Writing for the Chicago Sun-Times, Richard Roeper praised the production design and cast, but said the film was not as scary as the first, specifying, "For all of Muschietti's visual flourishes and with the greatly talented Bill Skarsgård again delivering a madcap, disturbingly effective, all-in performance as the dreaded Pennywise, It Chapter Two had a relatively muted impact on me." Varietys Peter DeBruge wrote, "The clown is back, and the kids have grown up in part two of Stephen King's monster novel, which inspires an overlong, but suitably scary sequel," while Christy Lemire of RogerEbert.com gave the film two-and-a-half out of four stars, stating that "It Chapter Two can be a sprawling, unwieldy mess—overlong, overstuffed and full of frustrating detours—but its casting is so spot-on, its actors have such great chemistry and its monster effects are so deliriously ghoulish that the film keeps you hooked."

Katie Rife of The A.V. Club gave the film a grade of "C+," praising Hader's performance but summarizing, "What a shame, then to build this beautiful stage, populate it with talented actors and high-level craftspeople, and then drop them all through the trap door of plodding humor and scattershot plotting." Aja Romano of Vox called the film "well-made and entertaining", but criticized what she termed the "lack of chemistry" between members of the adult cast, and wrote that the film "muddles [the] message" of the novel on which it is based. Rich Juzwiak of Jezebel gave the film a negative review, calling it "meandering" and "a movie that has no sense of its rules". The film also received criticism over Stan's suicide, as the film showed the suicide as a sacrifice intended to strengthen his friends and remove him as the weak link, whereas in the book he committed suicide purely out of terror. Critics with outlets such as Screen Rant and SyFy felt that it sent out a bad message to the audience, with William Bibbiani of Bloody Disgusting noting that it "potentially conveys a message to the audience that killing yourself could be a rational response to dealing with childhood trauma." Jessica Lachenal of Bustle criticized the film as running the risk of glorifying Stan's suicide as a "noble sacrifice", stating that it sends a dangerous message to those struggling with mental health issues.

Accolades

Future
In September 2019, Skarsgård spoke of the possibility of a third installment, saying, "It would have to be the right type of approach to it. The book ends where the second movie ends, so that is the final chapter of this story. There is this interesting aspect of going back in time before all this happened. There might be a story there that might be worth exploring. Obviously that would be a story that's not in the book, it would be a freestanding story, but obviously within the same universe. So, there might be something interesting out of it. I think it would be fun."

Two months later, Dauberman discussed in an interview of the possibility of a third film, saying, "I do think it's possible. Anything in the Stephen King Universe interests me, but there's only so much of the story we could tell in the two movies. There are definitely elements of the novel you could expand on and make its own movie. It's just a question of whether or not people want to see it. I do think It was on this planet for a very, very, very long time and that's a lot of bloodshed and a lot of stories to tell and I think you could do that for sure."

On March 21, 2022, Variety reported that the Muschiettis and Jason Fuchs are in development of and executive producing a prequel series for HBO Max titled Welcome to Derry that will take place in the 1960s before the events of It: Chapter One and will also include the origin story of Pennywise the Clown. Andy Muschietti will direct the first episode while Fuchs will write all episodes for the series. Stephen King stated that he would not be involved in the development of the series, but was looking forward to seeing it.  Principal photography is scheduled to begin in early April 2023 in Toronto, Canada.

References

External links

 
 
 
 

IMAX films
2019 films
2019 horror films
2019 horror thriller films
2010s teen films
2010s psychological horror films
2010s supernatural horror films
2010s American films
Films about teenagers
American horror thriller films
American films about revenge
American monster movies
American psychological horror films
American sequel films
American supernatural horror films
American buddy films
Demons in film
Films about domestic violence
Films about anti-LGBT sentiment
Films about writers
Films about comedians
Films about fashion designers
Films about child death
Films about shapeshifting
Films about friendship
Films about fear
Films based on American horror novels
Films based on works by Stephen King
Films directed by Andy Muschietti
Films produced by Dan Lin
Films scored by Benjamin Wallfisch
Films set in 1989
Films set in the 2010s
Films set in 2016
Films set in Maine
Films set in psychiatric hospitals
Films with screenplays by Gary Dauberman
Homophobia in fiction
Horror films about clowns
Native Americans in popular culture
It (novel)
LGBT-related horror films
Warner Bros. films
New Line Cinema films
Films set in studio lots
Films set in New York City
2019 LGBT-related films
Films produced by Roy Lee
Vertigo Entertainment films
2010s English-language films
ScreenX films
4DX films